Éder Patiño (born March 11, 1984, in Mexico City) is a Mexican former footballer who last played for UAT.

See also
Football in Mexico
List of football clubs in Mexico

References

External links

1984 births
Living people
Footballers from Mexico City
Mexican footballers
Association football goalkeepers